Führerhauptquartier Werwolf was the codename used for one of Adolf Hitler's World War II Eastern Front military headquarters located in a pine forest about  north of Vinnytsia, in Ukraine, which was used between 1942 and 1943. It was one of a number of Führer Headquarters throughout Europe, and the most easterly ever used by Hitler in person.

Naming 
The name is derived from Werwolf or Wehrwolf in German, which can be translated as werewolf. The Nazis also used the term Werwolf as a codename for clandestine resistance groups which were intended to carry out guerrilla attacks against the occupying forces towards the end of World War II. The naming scheme is in accord with other code-names given to Führerhauptquartiere during the Second World War, such as Wolfsschanze. Several were named for Hitler himself, whose nickname was Wolf. The site was also the easternmost Wehrmacht headquarters.

Headquarters 
It was built between December 1941 and June 1942 under top secret conditions by Soviet prisoners of war. In July 1941 the whole Vinnyts’ka oblast’ was occupied by the Nazi regime and later the entire region too. Systematic warcrimes took place in areas around where the Wehrwolf headquarter construction was; According to official figures, during the Nazi occupation of the region over 200,000 local civilians were killed, 25,000 in Vinnytsia in September 1941 and April 1942. 1,800 psychiatric patients were also shot, starved or poisoned. The Nazi regime built 18 camps for Soviet prisoners of war in the region, and several ghettos, labor camps and prisons for Jewish residents, all of whom were killed by the German occupants. Thousands of women, were sent to forced labor camps in Germany—61,000 people were removed from the Vinnytsia region to be replaced by German occupants. 

The location may have been influenced by the Nazis' proposed trans-European highway to the Crimean Peninsula, which would have connected with the site.

Hitler's accommodation at Werwolf (the Führerhaus) consisted of a modest log cabin built around a private courtyard with its own concrete bunker.  The rest of the complex consisted of about 20 wooden cottages and barracks and up to three "B" class bunkers, surrounded by ring of barbed wire and ground defensive positions connected by tunnels. A couple of observation points were set up on platforms in the oak trees surrounding the pine forest. The area was surrounded by a defensive strip of bunkers, anti-aircraft guns and tanks, as well as anti-tank ditches and minefields.

There was a tea house, a barber shop, a bathhouse, a sauna, a cinema and a swimming pool, primarily intended for Hitler who never used it. The facility also contained a large vegetable garden organised by the German horticultural company Zeidenspiner to provide Hitler with a secure supply of food. Hitler's personal chef selected his vegetables and the food was chemically analyzed before being tried by a taster because of Hitler's fear of poisoning. Oxygen tanks were also available at Hitler's insistence.  Water for the site was provided by artesian wells while power was provided by a generator. Some historians, including Lloyd Clark, indicate that some buildings were connected by tunnels.

The bunkers were constructed by Organisation Todt using some local Ukrainian workers, forced labour but mainly Soviet prisoners of war. The code name for the secret construction project was Anlage Eichenhain (Camp Oak Grove). The 4000 forced laborers were lined up and shot when construction was finished.

The complex was served by a daily three-hour flight connection from Berlin to the airfield in Kalinovka  from the compound. There was also a regular train connection from Berlin-Charlottenburg to "Eichenbein" station at Werwolf. The journey took 34 hours.

During Germany's Eastern campaign, Adolf Hitler lived mainly at FHQ Wolfsschanze (near Rastenburg, East Prussia) but he stayed at FHQ Werwolf three times:

In this condition, he gave his fateful Führer Directive 45, splitting Army Group South into two parts in a bid to reach both Stalingrad and the Caucasus oil fields simultaneously. The Directive was the main cause of the eventual defeat and destruction of the German 6th Army at Stalingrad and the German Army's subsequent withdrawal from Southern Russia to a new front near the Soviet city of Kursk.
 19 February to 13 March 1943: to observe Field Marshal Erich von Manstein's Kharkhov offensive in the wake of Germany's defeat at Stalingrad.
 27 August to 15 September 1943: to observe the unsuccessful defense of Kharkhov.

History
The Nazis destroyed the site, including mining access to the underground complex, upon abandoning the region. The site was examined after the Nazi departure in March 1944 under the orders of Joseph Stalin, but no documentation was found. The Soviet Union took steps to permanently seal the underground parts of the complex.

Today only the swimming pool and concrete fragments remain visible on the site, which is an open recreation area. The site can be visited but plans to create a full-fledged museum had not come to fruition as of August 2018. Nearby is a memorial to the thousands of labourers and others buried by the Nazis in gravepits at Stryzhavka.

Photos

See also
 Führer Headquarters

References

Bibliography

 Zeidler, Zeigert, Die Führerhauptquartiere.

Führer Headquarters
World War II sites in Ukraine
World War II sites of Nazi Germany
Buildings and structures in Vinnytsia
Museums in Vinnytsia Oblast
History of Vinnytsia